"Cancer" is a rock song  by American rock band My Chemical Romance. It is the eighth track from the group's third studio album The Black Parade. The song was released on October 23, 2006.

Composition
The original version of the song is written in the key of E major with a common time tempo of 70 beats per minute. The vocals span from E3 to A4 in the song.

A four bar bridge passage prior to the final chorus includes a transposed quotation from the 1958 Buddy Holly hit Raining in My Heart. Its chord progression (featuring a characteristic rising chromatic figure) is highly reminiscent of that from the verse of Raining in My Heart whilst the vocal line closely matches the rhythmic pattern and pitch content of the Bryant and Bryant-penned song. The entire song was written in 8 minutes.

Personnel
 Gerard Way – lead vocals
 Bob Bryar – drums
 Frank Iero – acoustic guitar, backing vocals
 Ray Toro – bass guitar, backing vocals
 Mikey Way – tambourine

Additional musicians
 Rob Cavallo – piano
 Jamie Muhoberac – B3 organ
 David Campbell – strings and horn arrangement

Certifications

Twenty One Pilots version 

American musical duo Twenty One Pilots recorded a cover of "Cancer" for British music magazine Rock Sounds 2016 compilation album, Rock Sound Presents: The Black Parade. It was teased by lead singer Tyler Joseph in January 2016, having uploaded a short clip of himself singing the song. The full version was released on September 14, 2016.

Composition 
The cover is played in the key of D Major with a common time tempo of 72 to 76 beats per minute. The vocals span from D3 to G4 in the song. It contains a piano part and also incorporates programmed beats and other electronic sounds. Rolling Stone described the song as "synth-laden" and featuring "additional lyric reprises and layered vocals, which gives the song an extra pensive vibe."

Reception 
Althea Legaspi of Rolling Stone wrote that "the duo stays faithful to the already melancholic song while ratcheting up the somberness a tad." Scott Shetler, writing for AXS, wrote that "Twenty One Pilots keep the melancholy while taking the song in a different direction." The lead singer of My Chemical Romance, Gerard Way, was impressed by the cover, saying in an interview with PopBuzz "There's a bit of rejuggling of parts and I was like 'Wow, this almost sounds like a remix,' but it's a cover by way of this, kind of, rearrangement and I was really impressed with it". Brii Jamieson of Rock Sound named it one of the band's best covers.

Music video 
On the day of its release, an animated lyric video was uploaded onto the band's YouTube channel. The video shows floating books and large bookshelves in a library. As of August 2021, its lyric video has received over 61 million views.

Personnel 
 Tyler Joseph – vocals, piano, keyboard, synthesizer, bass, programming
 Josh Dun – drums, percussion

Chart performance

Year-end charts

Certifications

References

2000s ballads
2006 songs
2016 singles
My Chemical Romance songs
Twenty One Pilots songs
The Black Parade (rock opera)
Rock ballads
Song recordings produced by Rob Cavallo
Songs written by Gerard Way
Songs written by Mikey Way
Songs written by Frank Iero
Songs written by Ray Toro
Songs about diseases and disorders
Songs about death
Songs about cancer